Myrow is a surname. Notable people with the surname include:

Brian Myrow (born 1976), American baseball player
Fred Myrow (1939–1999), American composer
Josef Myrow (1910–1987), Russian-American composer